The koel is a genus of birds.

Koel or KOEL may also refer to:
 KOEL (AM), a radio station (950 AM) licensed to Oelwein, Iowa, United States
 KOEL-FM, a radio station (92.3 FM) licensed to Oelwein, Iowa
 KKHQ-FM, a radio station (98.5 FM) licensed to Cedar Falls, Iowa, which held the call sign KOEL in 2003 and KOEL-FM from 2003 to 2020
 South Koel River, a river in Jharkhand, India, a tributary of the Brahmani River
 North Koel River, a river in Jharkhand, India, a tributary of the Son River

People  with the name 
 Ditmar Koel (1500s–1563), captain, pirate hunter and Mayor of Hamburg
 Gerard Koel (born 1941), Dutch cyclist
 Koel Mallick (born 1982), Indian film actress who appears in Bengali and Odia films
 Koel Purie (born 1978), Indian film actress, producer and TV presenter

See also 
 De Koel, a multi-purpose stadium in Venlo, Netherlands
 Köl (disambiguation)
 Coel